Kangrali may refer to:
Kangrali (BK), census town, Belgaum district, Karnataka, India
Kangrali (KH), census town, Belgaum district, Karnataka, India